is a platform mobile game, produced and published in 2006 by SNK Playmore for the i-mode on FOMA90x platform, as a real sequel of the original Athena video game.

Plot
It takes place after Princess Athena defeated Dante, but she is again bored with the peaceful days without adventures. This time she opens the Door Which Shouldn't Be Opened: B, disregarding the advice from her loyal maid Helene, an additional playable character who is proficient in magic, and they both fall to the Elysium World to face a bunch of new villains.

Gameplay
It features enough primary style as a homage to its predecessor, and many new elements along with the amusing Omake mode for mobile phone users. This game got a direct sequel soon after its immediate popularity which features new adventures in Helene's alma mater, the "Winning Witch Academy".

External links
 Athena: Full Throttle Official Website
Hardcore Gaming 101: Athena

2006 video games
Athena games
Platform games
SNK Playmore games
Mobile games
Japan-exclusive video games
Video games developed in Japan